This article show all participating team squads at the 2009 FIVB Volleyball World League, played by 16 countries.

The following is the  roster in the 2009 FIVB Volleyball World League.

The following is the  roster in the 2009 FIVB Volleyball World League.

The following is the  roster in the 2009 FIVB Volleyball World League.

The following is the  roster in the 2009 FIVB Volleyball World League.

The following is the  roster in the 2009 FIVB Volleyball World League.

The following is the  roster in the 2009 FIVB Volleyball World League.

The following is the  roster in the 2009 FIVB Volleyball World League.

The following is the  roster in the 2009 FIVB Volleyball World League.

The following is the  roster in the 2009 FIVB Volleyball World League.

The following is the roster in the 2009 FIVB Volleyball World League.

The following is the  roster in the 2009 FIVB Volleyball World League.

The following is the  roster in the 2009 FIVB Volleyball World League.

The following is the  roster in the 2009 FIVB Volleyball World League.

The following is the  roster in the 2009 FIVB Volleyball World League.

The following is the  roster in the 2009 FIVB Volleyball World League.

The following is the  roster in the 2009 FIVB Volleyball World League.

References

External links
Official website

2009
2009 in volleyball